ADAMTS-like protein 4 is a protein that in humans is encoded by the ADAMTSL4 gene.

Function 

This gene is a member of ADAMTS (a disintegrin and metalloproteinase with thrombospondin motifs)-like gene family and encodes a protein with seven thrombospondin type 1 repeats. The thrombospondin type 1 repeat domain is found in many proteins with diverse biological functions including cellular adhesion, angiogenesis, and patterning of the developing nervous system. Alternate transcriptional splice variants, encoding different isoforms, have been characterized.

References

Further reading

External links 
  GeneReviews/NCBI/NIH/UW entry on ADAMTSL4-Related Eye Disorders,Autosomal Recessive Isolated Ectopia Lentis,Ectopia Lentis et Pupillae